Torrington High School is the lone public high school in the city of Torrington, Connecticut. The current high school building opened in 1963 and was renovated in 2000.

Community 
Torrington is the commercial, industrial, and financial center of Northwestern Connecticut. It is the largest city in Litchfield County with a population of 36,383 in 2017. Torrington High School is a four-year comprehensive high school serving students with varying backgrounds and interests through a range of programs and co-curricular activities. As of the 2018-2019 school year, the Torrington School District consists of four elementary schools, one middle school, and one high school. In 2017, the expenditure per pupil is $17,049. Torrington High School is accredited by the New England Association of Schools and Colleges.

Rape cases

Notable alumni

 Joe Dugan, former MLB player
 Jordan Williams, University of Maryland Terrapins men's basketball team
 Naveen Selvadurai, co-founder of location-based social networking site Foursquare.com
 Elinor Carbone, mayor of Torrington
Patricia Wald, the first woman appointed to and to serve as the Chief Judge of the U.S. Court of Appeals, who later served on the International Criminal Tribunal in The Hague. In 2013, President Barack Obama awarded her the Presidential Medal of Freedom, the nation’s highest civilian honor.

Gallery

References

External links 
 
 Torrington School District

Buildings and structures in Torrington, Connecticut
Schools in Litchfield County, Connecticut
Public high schools in Connecticut